Řeporyje is a cadastral area of Prague. Most of it belongs to the municipal district of the same name, the rest belonging to Prague 13. Řeporyje became part of Prague in 1974, before which it was recorded as a městys.

The district is situated on Dalejský potok and borders Prokopské údolí to the east. The western part of Řeporyje is an industrial area, marked by the visually prominent silo belonging to Soufflet Agro a.s. The district is served by Praha-Řeporyje railway station, a passing point on the Praha – Rudná – Beroun railway line.

Global stratigraphic boundary
Řeporyje is home of a global stratigraphic boundary for the Silurian. The base boundary for the Přídolí epoch and stage is located in a quarry southwest of Řeporyje.

Gallery

References

External links 
 Praha-Řeporyje - Official homepage

Districts of Prague